Budo Punder  is a village in Kapurthala district of Punjab State, India. The village is administrated by a Sarpanch, who is an elected representative.

Demography 
According to the report published by Census India in 2011, Budo Punder has a total number of 29 houses and population of 143 of which include 76 males and 67 females. Literacy rate of Budo Punder is 85.51%, higher than state average of 75.84%.  The population of children under the age of 6 years is 5 which is 3.50% of total population of Budo Punder, and child sex ratio is approximately  667, lower than state average of 846.

Population data

Air travel connectivity 
The closest airport to the village is Sri Guru Ram Dass Jee International Airport.

Villages in Kapurthala

External links
  Villages in Kapurthala
 Kapurthala Villages List

References

Villages in Kapurthala district